Nieuwendijk is a hamlet in the Dutch province of South Holland. It is a part of the municipality of Hoeksche Waard and lies about 9 km south of Spijkenisse.

Nieuwendijk was severely damaged during the North Sea flood of 1953, and 36 emergency houses were donated by Norway to the village. It has a little church, but it has been vacant since 2018.

Nieuwendijk is not a statistical entity, and considered part of Zuid-Beijerland and Goudswaard. It has no place name signs, and consists of about 150 houses.

References

Populated places in South Holland
Hoeksche Waard